Melichar may refer to:
 Alois Melichar (1896–1976), an Austrian conductor, music critic, film music composer and arranger
 Darlene Yee-Melichar, a professor and coordinator of the Gerontology Program at San Francisco State University
 Josef Melichar (born 1979), a retired Czech professional ice hockey player
 Leopold Melichar (1856–1924), an entomologist
 Nicole Melichar (born 1993), a Czech-born American tennis player
 Tomáš Melichar (living), a Czech entomologist